Dactyloctenium aegyptium, or Egyptian crowfoot grass is a member of the family Poaceae native in Africa. The plant mostly grows in heavy soils at damp sites.

Description 

This grass creeps and has a straight shoot which are usually about 30 centimeters tall.

Food
Dactyloctenium aegyptium is still a traditional food plant used as a famine food in Africa, this little-known grain has potential to improve nutrition, boost food security, foster rural development and support sustainable landcare.

Invasive species
In other areas of the world, including parts of the United States, the grass is considered a weed and invasive species.

References

External links 
Jepson Manual Treatment: Dactyloctenium aegyptium
USDA Plants Profile - Dactyloctenium aegyptium
Grass Manual Treatment
Virginia Tech Weed Identification
Dactyloctenium aegyptium - Photo gallery
 

aegyptium
Flora of Africa
Flora of Egypt
Flora of Eritrea
Crops originating from Africa
Cereals
Flora of Malta